The Western New Guinea campaign was a series of actions in the New Guinea campaign of World War II. Dutch East Indies KNIL, United States and Australian forces assaulted Japanese bases and positions in the northwest coastal areas of Netherlands New Guinea and adjoining parts of the Australian Territory of New Guinea. The campaign began with Operations Reckless and Persecution, which were amphibious landings by the U.S. I Corps at Hollandia and Aitape on 22 April 1944. Fighting in western New Guinea continued until the end of the war.

Major battles and sub-campaigns

Landing at Aitape
Battle of Hollandia
 Battle of Wakde
 Battle of Lone Tree Hill
 Battle of Morotai
 Battle of Biak
 Battle of Noemfoor
 Battle of Driniumor River
 Battle of Sansapor
 Aitape-Wewak campaign

See also
Operation Semut
Operation Agas
Naval Base Borneo
US Naval Advance Bases
List of Royal Australian Navy bases

Bibliography
 
 
 
 

Indonesia in World War II
Conflicts in 1944
Conflicts in 1945
1944 in the Dutch East Indies
1945 in the Dutch East Indies
1944 in Papua New Guinea
1945 in Papua New Guinea
South West Pacific theatre of World War II
Western New Guinea
Campaigns of World War II
Battles and operations of World War II involving Papua New Guinea
Battles of World War II involving the United States
Battles of World War II involving Australia
Battles of World War II involving Japan